Tegecoelotes is a genus of Asian funnel weavers first described by S. V. Ovtchinnikov in 1999.

Species
 it contains fifteen species:

Tegecoelotes chikunii Okumura, Ono & Nishikawa, 2011 – Japan
Tegecoelotes corasides (Bösenberg & Strand, 1906) – Japan
Tegecoelotes dorsatus (Uyemura, 1936) – Japan
Tegecoelotes dysodentatus Zhang & Zhu, 2005 – China
Tegecoelotes echigonis Nishikawa, 2009 – Japan
Tegecoelotes eurydentatus Zhang, Zhu & Wang, 2017 – China
Tegecoelotes hibaensis Okumura, Ono & Nishikawa, 2011 – Japan
Tegecoelotes ignotus (Bösenberg & Strand, 1906) – Japan
Tegecoelotes michikoae (Nishikawa, 1977) – Japan
Tegecoelotes mizuyamae Ono, 2008 – Japan
Tegecoelotes otomo Nishikawa, 2009 – Japan
Tegecoelotes religiosus Nishikawa, 2009 – Japan
Tegecoelotes secundus (Paik, 1971) – Russia (Far East), China, Korea, Japan
Tegecoelotes tateyamaensis Nishikawa, 2009 – Japan
Tegecoelotes yogoensis Nishikawa, 2009 – Japan

References

External links

Agelenidae
Araneomorphae genera
Spiders of Asia